The Air Force School (TAFS), formerly known as Air Force Central School (AFCS), was set up primarily to provide education to the children of Indian Air Force personnel.

It was founded in 1955 by the Air Marshal Subroto Mukherjee, the Chief of Air Staff. It was established in temporary wartime barracks at Wellingdon Camp, Club Road, New Delhi on 18 July 1955 to educate children of Officers and Airmen of the Indian Air Force. In May 1967, the school shifted to its present location Aravali Campus location in Subroto Park, Delhi Cantonment; it had been located in New Delhi near the present residence of the Prime Minister. The school celebrated its Silver Jubilee in 1980 when the word "Central" was dropped from the name. The school is a co-educational public institute affiliated to the Central Board of Secondary Education (CBSE). It has boarding facilities for boys of classes VI to XII. It has classes from Kindergarten to Class XII. The school is situated on the Aravali ridge.

The school has an auditorium named as Aravali Hall. There are two separate 'wings' in the school. The junior wing has classes Kindergarten to V. The senior wing has classes VI to XII.

Although the school was established primarily for the benefit of children belonging to the IAF personnel, it has always been open to wards of Army and Navy personnel as well as to civilians.

The school, and its sister schools, Air Force Bal Bharati School (AFBBS) and the Air Force Golden Jubilee Institute (AFGJI) are run by the Indian Air Force Educational and Cultural Society.

Management

The Managing Committee of the school is headed by the Joint Director of Education of the Directorate of Education, Air Headquarters (R.K. Puram) New Delhi. The Committee consists of some officers of the Indian Air Force and two elected representatives of the teaching staff; one elected representative of the parents, two nominated members each of the Directorate of Education, Delhi Administration and of the Education Advisory Board, Delhi Administration. The Board of Governors, presided over by the Air Officer in charge of Administration, Air Headquarters is the body for all the schools run by the IAF Education Society. The Vice Principal looks after the academics, assisted by the Headmistress of the Junior Wing and the Head of the Department of each faculty. The Administrative Officer cum Bursar and the Accountant, look after the accounts, administration and management.

Affiliations

The Air Force School is a co-educational public school. The school is affiliated to the Central Board of Secondary Education and students are prepared for the All India Secondary School Examination (Class X) and the All India Senior School Certificate Examination (Class XII). The School is a member of the Indian Public Schools' Conference (IPSC) and also of National Progressive Schools' Conference (NPSC).

Notable alumni

 Anoop Malhotra (Lt. General, Indian Army)
 Ashok Malhotra (Professor, University of British Columbia)
 Nikesh Arora (CEO, Palo Alto Networks, previously, President & COO of SoftBank Corp and SVP and Chief Business Officer, Google)
 Pawanexh Kohli (Chief Advisor, National Centre for Cold-chain Development, GOI)
 Rakesh Sharma (Movie Director, Film Maker)
 Rini Simon Khanna (News Anchor)
 Vijay Shankar (Retd.) (Vice Admiral, Indian Navy)
 Kavery Nambisan (Surgeon and writer)
Subrahmanyam Jaishankar (Minister of External Affairs)
 Parvez Dewan (Indian Administrative Service J&K Cadre. Secretary, India Tourism)
 Kabir Sadanand (Movie Director and Producer)
 Mohammad Jawed (Member of Parliament, Kishanganj)
 Aparna Sharma (model, actress)

Programmes

The school offers four main streams - Humanities, Commerce, Science (Medical) and Science (Non-medical). Besides English and Physical Education, subjects offered are:
 Humanities: Mathematics, Applied Mathematics, Economics, History, Geography, Political Science, Psychology, Home Science, Informatics Practices.
 Commerce: Accountancy, Business Studies, Economics, Mathematics, Applied Mathematics, Geography, Home Science, Informatics Practices.
 Science (Medical): Mathematics, Applied Mathematics, Physics, Chemistry, Biology, Home Science, Psychology, Informatics Practices.
 Science (Non-medical): Mathematics, Physics, Chemistry, Computer Science, Economics.

The school site, known as Aravali campus, is situated at the Aravali Ridge. The 100 yards campus includes instructional blocks, laboratories and an SUPW activities complex; a music division, staff quarters and a boarding house. The school sickbay functions under the supervision of a Resident Medical Officer and a Resident Medical Assistant. The medical staff, besides providing medical assistance to the students, conduct annual medical check ups.

The school conducts classes in activities under Socially Useful Productive Work (SUPW) : music - instrumental and vocal, dance, painting, sculpture, wood work, electronics and journalism. The school has societies and clubs with a teacher in-charge for each. These include Wild Life and Nature Club, Photography, Science, and Music. In the Home Science department boys are trained in household activities and House Maintenance, Home Economics and Nutrition.

Adjoining the school campus there are play fields for hockey, cricket, and football, and a 400-meter track. The Sports Authority of India has started coaching in football, hockey, and basketball for students. Students take part in mountaineering, rock climbing, trekking and adventure camps at hill stations and mountaineering institutes.

References

External links

 The Air Force School, Subroto Park website
 TAFS Alumni

Schools in Delhi
Boarding schools in Delhi
Educational institutions established in 1955
Indian Air Force
1955 establishments in India